The Dubai Airshow is a biennial air show held in Dubai, United Arab Emirates under the patronage of Sheikh Mohammed bin Rashid Al Maktoum, Vice President and Prime Minister of the UAE and Ruler of Dubai, in cooperation with Dubai Civil Aviation Authority, Dubai Airports, Dubai World Central and the UAE Armed Forces. It is organised by Tarsus Aerospace since 1989. The event is "open to business professionals and industry only".

History

1986
The Dubai Airshow started life as Arab Air in 1986 - a small civil aviation trade show which F&E organised at the Dubai World Trade Centre.

1989
The first Dubai Airshow was held in 1989 at Dubai Airport, spurred on by substantial Middle East investment in civil and military aviation. The Dubai Airshow grew from 200 exhibitors and 25 aircraft in 1989.

1991
In 1991 due to the outbreak of the Gulf War the show was moved from January to November and it had a strong military focus given events in the region.

2001
The 2001 show took place just 6 weeks after the events of September 11, 2001, and closed with record order book of US$15.6 billion.

2003
The Dubai Airshow 2003 was the fastest-selling in the event's history, 550 companies from 36 countries participated.

2005

In 2005 the Airshow hosted the debut of the A380 in the Middle East. It arrived in full Emirates livery for its largest customer.

2013

In 2013, 1,046 exhibitors came from 60 countries, drawing 60,692 trade attendees for a record $206.1 billion order book of aircraft, parts and MRO deals.
The display presented 163 aircraft.
Emirates made the highest price airliner order with $99 billion for 150 newly launched Boeing 777Xs plus 50 options and 50 Airbus A380s.

2017 

Airbus displayed the A350-900 and A319 airliners, and the A400M and C-295 military airlifters, Beriev its Be-200ES jet amphibian, Boeing the 737 MAX 8 and 787-10 jetliners, Bombardier Aerospace the CS300 small narrowbody, Embraer its Phenom 100 small business jet, and Sukhoi its Superjet 100 regional jet.
Organizers forecast 9% more visitors than in 2015 to 72,000, joined by 1,200 exhibitors, 1,350 media representatives and 160 aircraft on display and claims to be the largest after Le Bourget and Farnborough, but before Singapore Air Show by number of exhibitors, square meters and visitors.

On November 12, Emirates committed to purchase 40 Boeing 787-10s in two- and three-class cabins for 240 to 330 passengers, to be delivered from 2022 with conversion rights to the smaller Boeing 787-9, pushing orders for the 787-10 from 171 to over 200.
The order is worth $15.1 billion at list prices.

On November 15, Indigo Partners (unrelated to Indian LCC IndiGo) signed a memorandum of understanding for 430 Airbus at the Dubai air show : 273 A320neos and 157 A321neos for $49.5 billion at list prices; Indigo controls Frontier Airlines and Chilean low-cost start-up JetSmart, holds stakes in Mexican budget airline Volaris and European LCC Wizz Air: 146 aircraft will go to Wizz, 134 to Frontier, 80 to Volaris and 70 to JetSmart. The same day, Flydubai commit to order 175 Boeing 737 Max and 50 purchase rights for $27 billion at list prices: Max 8s, Max 9s and 50 Max 10s.

In 2017, 874 commitments and options were announced including 15% firm, compared with 67 in 2015 and 684 in 2013, 74.9% from LCCs, 15.7% from lessors and 8.1% from mainline carriers.
These were mainly narrowbodies with 825 against 47 widebodies, Airbus had 547 commitments for a $28.2 Billion market value and Boeing had 301 for $19.5 Billion.

2019 

On the opening day of the Dubai Airshow 2019, Sheikh Mohammed bin Zayed and Sheikh Hamdan took a private tour the latest super-jumbo aircraft by Emirates, Airbus A380. A similar aircraft also led the way during the opening procession of the Dubai Airshow 2019.

On 18 November 2019, the second day of the biennial airshow, Emirates announced an order worth a total of $16 billion for 50 Airbus A350-900 aircraft. The delivery for the largest deal of Airbus was scheduled to begin from May 2023.

On 18 November 2019, Air Arabia also sealed the deal with Airbus at the Dubai Airshow 2019, whose total book value exceeded $14 billion. The order was for 120 Airbus A320 family aircraft, including  73 of the high-efficiency A320neo variants and 23 A321XLR.

On 19 November, the Emirates signed an agreement to purchase 30 Boeing 787-9 Dreamliner aircraft. The deal was valued at $8.8 billion.

The order book on site reached $54.5 billion by close of business at the Dubai Airshow 2019.

2021 
The 2021 Dubai Airshow began on 14 November 2021 and lasted for 5 days until 18 November 2021.

Indigo Partners placed firm orders for 255 A321 Neo aircraft. Jazeera Airways placed an order for 28 A321 Neos. Ibom Air ordered 10 A220s. Air Lease Corporation ordered seven A350 freighters. On November 16, Indian airline Akasa Air also placed an order for 72 Boeing 737 MAX aircraft. Jetex was the official FBO at the show. 

The Sukhoi Su-75 Checkmate made its international debut at the show.

Israeli companies, including Israel Aerospace Industries and Rafael Advanced Defense Systems participated at the show for the first time.

2023 
The 2023 Dubai Airshow is scheduled to be held in November 2023.

Flying display

The flying display demonstrates the technical capabilities of exhibiting companies aircraft.  The flying display at the Dubai Airshow has included the Airbus A380, A400M, F-16, F/A-18, F-22 Raptor, V-22 Osprey, B-1B, Eurofighter Typhoon along with aerobatic displays by international teams including Patrouille de France, Red Arrows from the UK and Al Fursan from the UAE.

References

External links 

 
 
 

Airshow
Aviation in the United Arab Emirates
Air shows
Recurring events established in 1989
1989 establishments in the United Arab Emirates
Biennial events
Articles containing video clips
Trade fairs in the United Arab Emirates